Miss Polski 2018 was the 29th Miss Polski pageant, held on December 9, 2018. The winner was Olga Buława of West Pomerania and she represented Poland in Miss Universe 2019. 1st Runner-Up Karina Szczepanek represented Poland at Miss International 2019.

Final results

Special Awards

Judges
Kamila Świerc – Miss Polski 2017 from Opole
Viola Piekut – Fashion Designer
Tomasz Olejniczak – Fashion designer
Renata Kaczoruk – Model
Maria Niklińska – Actress
Dominika Tajner-Wiśniewska – Manager of the Stars

Finalists

Notes

Did not compete
 Lubusz
 Lower Silesia
 Upper Poland
 Polish Community in Argentina
 Polish Community in Australia
 Polish Community in Belarus
 Polish Community in Brazil
 Polish Community in Canada
 Polish Community in France
 Polish Community in Germany
 Polish Community in Ireland
 Polish Community in Israel
 Polish Community in Lithuania
 Polish Community in Russia
 Polish Community in South Africa
 Polish Community in Sweden
 Polish Community in the U.S.
 Polish Community in Venezuela

References

External links
Official Website

2018
2018 beauty pageants
2018 in Poland